Sheldon Rampton (born August 4, 1957) is an American editor and author. He was editor of PR Watch, and is the author of several books that criticize the public relations industry and what he sees as other forms of corporate and government propaganda.

Education
Rampton was born in Long Beach, California. At the age of one, his family moved to Las Vegas, Nevada, where his father worked as a musician. Raised as a member of the Church of Jesus Christ of Latter-day Saints (LDS Church), he spent two years in Japan as a Latter-day Saint missionary from 1976 to 1978. Upon returning to the United States, however, he left the LDS Church, influenced in part by Mormon feminist Sonia Johnson.

Career
Upon graduation in 1982, Rampton worked as a newspaper reporter before becoming a peace activist. During the 1980s and 1990s, he worked closely with the Wisconsin Coordinating Council on Nicaragua (WCCN), which opposed the Reagan administration's military interventions in Central America and works to promote economic development, human rights, and mutual friendship between the people of the United States and Nicaragua. At WCCN, Rampton helped establish the Nicaraguan Credit Alternatives Fund (NICA Fund) in 1992, which channels loans from US investors to support microcredit and other "alternative credit" programs in Nicaragua.

In 1995, Rampton teamed with John Stauber as co-editors of PR Watch, a publication of the Center for Media and Democracy (CMD). They were described as liberal, and their writings are regarded by some members of the public relations industry as one-sided and hostile, but their work drew wide attention. ActivistCash, a website hosted by Washington lobbyist Richard Berman, has castigated them as "self-anointed watchdogs," "scare-mongers," "reckless" and "left-leaning." Rampton and Stauber have in turn argued that the ActivistCash critique contains a number of "demonstrably false" claims.  According to a review in the Denver Post, their 1995 book, Toxic Sludge Is Good for You, offered "a sardonic, wide-ranging look at the public relations industry."

Rampton is also a contributor to the Wikipedia open content project, and was the person who coined the name "Wikimedia" which later became the name of the foundation that manages Wikipedia and its sister projects. Inspired by Wikipedia's collaborative writing model, Rampton founded Disinfopedia (now known as SourceWatch), another CMD project, to complement his PR Watch work to expose what Rampton perceives as deceptive and misleading public relations campaigns.

After leaving the Center for Media and Democracy in 2009, Rampton became a website developer, joining an open government initiative led by New York State Senate chief information officer Andrew Hoppin. In 2010, Hoppin and Rampton co-founded NuCivic, an open source software company, which they sold in December 2014 to GovDelivery, a software services company now known as Granicus. Rampton currently works as a software engineer at Granicus.

Writings by Rampton
With Liz Chilsen:
Friends In Deed: The Story of US-Nicaragua Sister Cities (1987)
With John Stauber:
 Toxic Sludge Is Good For You: Lies, Damn Lies and the Public Relations Industry (1995)
Mad Cow U.S.A.: Could the Nightmare Happen Here? (1997)
Trust Us, We're Experts: How Industry Manipulates Science and Gambles With Your Future (2001)
Weapons of Mass Deception: The Uses of Propaganda in Bush's War on Iraq (2003)
Banana Republicans (2004)
The Best War Ever: Lies, Damned Lies, and the Mess in Iraq (2006)

References

External links
PR Watch
Sheldon Rampton's home page

1957 births
Living people
American media critics
American social sciences writers
Writers from California
Former Latter Day Saints
Princeton University alumni
Propaganda theorists
Public relations theorists
Historians of public relations
American Mormon missionaries in Japan
20th-century Mormon missionaries
Framing theorists
Wikipedia people